League tables for teams participating in Kakkonen, the third tier of the Finnish Soccer League system, in 2003.

League tables 2003

Southern Group, Etelälohko

Eastern Group, Itälohko

Western Group, Länsilohko

Northern Group, Pohjoislohko

Promotion Playoff

Round 1

IFK Mariehamn – Kings 4–2
Kings – IFK Mariehamn 2–1

IFK Mariehamn won 5–4 on aggregate

MP – PK-35 0–0
PK-35 – MP 1–1

MP won on away goals

TPV – PS Kemi 1–4
PS Kemi – TPV 2–1

PS Kemi won 6–2 on aggregate

TUS – P-Iirot 0–1
P-Iirot – TUS 2–1

P-Iirot won 3–1 on aggregate

Round 2

IFK Mariehamn – PS Kemi 2–0
PS Kemi – IFK Mariehamn 3–1 (2–0)

IFK Mariehamn won on away goals and were promoted to Division 1

MP – P-Iirot 3–1
P-Iirot – MP 2–1

MP won 4–3 on aggregate and were promoted to Division 1

Division One/Division Two Playoff

P-Iirot – GBK Kokkola 3–0
GBK – P-Iirot 1–1

P-Iirot won 4–1 on aggregate and were promoted to Division 1.  GBK were relegated to Division 2

PS Kemi – FC Kuusankoski 2–3
FC Kuusankoski – PS Kemi 2–0

FC Kuusankoski won 5–2 on aggregate and remain in Division 1.  PS Kemi remain in Division 2

Relegation playoff

PMP EJ – Kiffen 0–3
Kiffen – PMP EJ 5–1

Kiffen won 8–1 on aggregate and remain in Division 2.

Huima – FCV 4–2
FCV – Huima 0–1

Huima won 5–2 on aggregate and were promoted to Division 2.

ÅIFK – MaPS 2–1
MaPS – ÅIFK 2–0

MaPS won 3–2 on aggregate and remain in Division 2.

NFF – KaIK 0–3

NFF withdrew and KaIK remain in Division 2.

Footnotes

References and sources
Finnish FA, Suomen Palloliitto 

Kakkonen seasons
3
Fin
Fin